Nicolás Almagro was the two-time defending champion but decided not to participate.
Albert Montañés won the title, defeating Gaël Monfils in the final, 6–0, 7–6.(7–3)

Seeds
The top four seeds received a bye into the second round.

Draw

Finals

Top half

Bottom half

Qualifying

Seeds
The top four seeds received a bye into the second round.

Qualifiers

Lucky losers
  Ryan Harrison

Qualifying draw

First qualifier

Second qualifier

Third qualifier

Fourth qualifier

External links
 Main draw
 Qualifying draw

Singles